Workday may refer to:
 Workday, Inc., a cloud-based business applications company
 A day in the workweek
 Work day, the period of time in a day spent at paid occupational labor